The Germany men's national under-21 volleyball team represents Germany in international men's volleyball competitions and friendly matches under the age 21 and it is ruled by the German Volleyball Association body that is an affiliate of the Federation of International Volleyball FIVB and also part of the European Volleyball Confederation CEV.

Results
For  team record, look here.

FIVB U21 World Championship
 Champions   Runners-up   Third place   Fourth place

Europe U21 / 20 Championship
 Champions   Runners-up   Third place   Fourth place

Team

Current squad
The following players are the German players that have competed in the 2018 Men's U20 Volleyball European Championship

fix table

References

External links
 www.volleyball-verband.de 

National men's under-21 volleyball teams
Volleyball
Volleyball in Germany